Dnipro-Holovnyi is the main railway station of Dnipro. Dnipropetrovsk Oblast, Ukraine.

History
The station was opened in 1884, called Ekaterinoslav.

July 20, 1926, the Presidium of the USSR Central Executive Committee of the city and station Ekaterinoslav was renamed to Dnipropetrovsk.

During the Holodomor, British journalist Gareth Jones noted that it was filled with starving peasants desperate for food. 

During World War II the building was destroyed and in its place under the project of architect Alexey Dushkin in 1951 and built a new station building.

On 19 May 2016 the official name of Dnipropetrovsk was changed to Dnipro. Hence the official name of the station was changed to Dnipro-Holovnyi.

Trains
 Kyiv — Zaporizhzhia
 Dnipro — Lviv
 Zaporizhzhia — Lviv
 Zaporizhzhia — Ivano-Frankivsk
 Zaporizhzhia — Kovel
 Dnipro — Odessa
 Dnipro — Kyiv
 Kharkiv — Odessa

References

External links
 Train times on Poezda.org

Dnipro
railway station
Railway stations opened in 1884